The rivière Mékinac du Sud (English: South Mékinac River) is a watercourse flowing in Grandes-Piles, Hérouxville and Saint-Tite, in the  Mékinac Regional County Municipality (MRC), in the administrative region of Mauricie, in Quebec, in Canada.

Geography 
This river has two main sources in the mountains of Grandes-Piles:
 Lake Gabriel, whose waters flow successively into Lac de la Bouteille and Lac à la Truite.
 the two Jean-Baptiste lakes, whose waters flow successively into Lac des Caribous, a small unidentified lake, Lac Gagnon and Lac à la Truite ( in length including the bay to the north and 700 in width). The latter lake also receives the waters of Castor Lake on the southwest side.

Upper course

From Lac à la Truite, the waters descend for a kilometer to empty into Lac Tavibois at Grandes-Piles, located in the Tavibois area. A retention dam has been built at its mouth with automated control of the water level; this dam is located on the boundary between Grandes-Piles and Hérouxville. After this dam, the water crosses a fall to flow  further southeast into Lake Léo which has a small dam at its mouth. This lake flows eastwards into Tessier lake that the current crosses on  towards the North. The lake collects a stream (coming from the north) which drains the western slope of Le Chaudron mountain which straddles the limit of Saint-Tite and Hérouxville, almost at the limit from Grandes-Piles.

From there, the course of the river heads south on  first by forming serpentines, then crossing the Petit lac du Castor and very narrow), to the dam located at its mouth, south of the lake. About thirty chalets surround the Petit lac du Castor.

From this last dam, the current descends towards the south-east, crosses towards the north a small narrow lake to the small dam at its mouth. From there, the current flows on  eastward, forming two hooks, one north, the other south, to the discharge (coming from the north) of a lake.

Lower course

From there, the river heads northeast on  where it crosses the Saint-Tite boundary. Then the river crosses another  in the zone to cut the route 159. And the mouth of the Mékinac du Sud river is  further away, as the water flows into the North Mékinac River.

Toponymy 
The toponym Rivière Mékinac du Sud was formalized on December 5, 1968, at the Place Names Bank of the Commission de toponymie du Québec.

References

Appendices

See also 
 List of rivers of Quebec

External links 
 

Rivers of Mauricie
Mékinac Regional County Municipality